Xie Feng (1922 – August 21, 2004) was a People's Republic of China politician. He was born in Yi County, Hebei Province. He joined the Chinese Communist Party in 1939. He was governor of his home province.

1922 births
2004 deaths
People's Republic of China politicians from Hebei
Chinese Communist Party politicians from Hebei
Governors of Hebei
Chinese police officers
Politicians from Baoding